Kültəpə (also rendered as Aşağı Gültəpə, Gültəpə, Kyul'tepe, Kul'tepe, and Kultepe) is a settlement dating from the Neolithic Age, a village and municipality in the Babek District of Nakhchivan, Azerbaijan. It has a population of 1,859.

Research
In 1951, archeologist Osman Habibulla began excavation in the settlement, clarifying the stratigraphy and cultural strata of the area. The tell was much disturbed in the past.

As excavators had found, the town features a cultural layer with the total depth of 22 m. The earliest 9 m of this belongs to the Neolithic Age. Some Halaf culture artifacts have been found.

On top of that are the remains of the Bronze Age, and then the Early Iron Age.

At each of these layers a variety of artifacts were found: pottery dishes, cattle-breeding and agricultural implements, adornments, weapons etc.

In the Eneolithic layer the excavators discovered remains of buildings, as well as burial places. These buildings were round as well as rectangular-shaped, and were made of mudbrick. The diameter of the round constructions was around 6–8 meters. The rectangular ones are about 15 sq. m in size. These structures were typically connected with agriculture.

85 burial places were investigated in the Eneolithic layer. In 31 of those excavators found pottery dishes, items made of bones and stone, and beads.

Copper-arsenic
Soviet scientists decided that Kultepe (Kul'tepe) is the place where the first items made of copper-arsenic alloys, dating back to the 4th millennium BC, were found in the South Caucasus.

The local method of arsenic copper production was confirmed by results of chemical investigation and casting forms and the remains of casting discovered there.

Regional influence
Archaeological site Alikemek Tepesi is located in the Mugan plain along the Aras (river). Some archaeologists speak of the ancient Alikemek-Kul'tepe culture of southeastern Caucasus, that followed the Shulaveri-Shomu culture, and covered the transition from the Neolithic to Chalcolithic periods (c. 4500 BC). Aratashen (following level II) was also part of this culture.

The Alikemek–Kul'tepe culture covered the Ararat Plain, Nakhchivan, the Mil’skoj and Mugan Steppes and the region around Lake Urmia in north-western Iran

Kultepe 2
Kültepe 2 is located about 1.5 km north of Kultepe 1, or about 10 km north of Nakhchivan (city) on the west bank of the river between the villages of Kültepe and Didivar. The site is nearly 10 ha in extent; it was occupied during the Early (Kura-Araxes culture), and Middle Bronze Age.

Osman Abibullaev first investigated this location in 1962, as part of his work on Kültepe 1. In 2006, the Naxçivan Archaeological Project started to investigate the site again.

The Kura-Araxes town may have been c. 5 hectares, and over the later period the settlement extended to the full 10 ha, so this is a very large site in the area.

Coordinates: N 39.2886, E 45.4474.

Other monuments 
There was a 17th-century Armenian church (St. Hripsime Church) located in the center of the village. The church was destroyed at some point between 1997 and 2009.

See also
Makhta Kultepe
Kul Tepe Jolfa in Iran
Zeyvə, Nakhchivan
St. Hripsime Church (Kultepe)

Gallery

References

External links
 Шалала Багирова. Расписные сосуды из Кюльтепе. Журнал «Azerbaijan Archeology».

Literature
 Абибуллаев О. А. Некоторые итоги изучения холма Кюльтепе в Азербайджане, СА, 1963.
 Абибуллаев О. А. Энеолит и бронза на территории Нахчыванской АССР, Баку, 1983.

Tells (archaeology)
Populated places in Babek District
Kura-Araxes culture
Halaf culture
Chalcolithic sites of Asia
Archaeological sites in Azerbaijan